HMAS Tingira was a training ship operated by the Royal Australian Navy (RAN) between 1911 and 1927. Alexander Hall & Co. built the ship in Scotland in 1866 as the passenger clipper Sobraon; she was the largest composite-hull sailing vessel ever built. She sailed on an annual migration run between England and Australia until 1891, when she was sold to the colonial government of New South Wales for use as a reformatory ship. The vessel was then sold to the federal government in 1911, and entered RAN service. Tingira was paid off in 1927, but despite efforts to preserve the ship, was broken up in 1941.

Design and construction

Sobraon was designed as a combination steam-sail ship, but plans to integrate a steam-powered propulsion system were cancelled while the ship was being built. The hull was of composite construction - teak planking over an iron frame. Sobraon was the largest composite-hull sailing vessel ever built.

Allexander Hall & Sons built Sobraon at Aberdeen, Scotland. She was given the yard number 239. The ship, named after the Battle of Sobraon, was launched on 17 April 1866.

Operational history

Sobraon
The ship was built for Shaw, Lowther, Maxton & Co., but was initially operated by the firm Devitt and Moore, who purchased the vessel in 1870. Sobraon was used on the England to Australia migration route, and made one trip per year from England. Her maiden voyage departed London on 9 November and Plymouth 21 November 1866, reaching Australia on 4 February 1867. Initially, voyages ended in Sydney, but from 1872 onwards, Sobraon began sailing to Melbourne instead. The ship's high speed, along with onboard facilities like a water condenser,  ice chamber, and fresh milk daily from onboard livestock, made Sobraon one of the more popular migration ships. On the first three return voyages, Sobraon would take on a cargo of Indian tea and race other ships back to England to deliver the first cargo. After the third voyage, the ship was instead loaded with cargoes of Australian wheat and wool for the return leg.

On 14 October 1890, Sobraon sailed on her final voyage to Australia. She reached Melbourne on 4 January 1891, was sold later that month to the New South Wales Government, then towed to Sydney. In the hands of the colony's government, Sobraon was assigned to the State Welfare Department and refitted for use as a reformatory ship, where delinquent boys were trained in the skills for a maritime career. Moored off Cockatoo Island and operated under the designation "Nautical School Ship Sobraon", over 4,000 boys were hosted and trained across a 20-year period.

HMAS Tingira
The Australian federal government purchased the ship in 1911 for use as a training ship for the fledgling Royal Australian Navy (RAN). She was refitted, commissioned into the RAN as HMAS Tingira (an Aboriginal word for "open sea") on 25 April 1912, and moored in Rose Bay. Up to 250 boys between the ages of 14½ and 16 could be trained at any time, although the trainee complement rarely exceeded 200. Between 1912 and 1927, 3,158 boys were trained for naval service. As Tingira was immobilised, the steam yacht  was attached to the training ship as a tender, and used to provide seagoing experience to recruits.

Fate
Tingira was paid off on 30 June 1927, and laid up in Berry's Bay. In 1929, the ship was sold to a private owner, but he did not put her to any use before passing away in 1935. Tingira was then purchased by Major Friere (a retired British Army officer) in 1936, who was working with Louisa Ankin to preserve the ship as a national relic. Two years later, the ship was sold to a ship breaker by mortgagees; Friere and Ankin attempted to repurchase the ship, but were unsuccessful. Tingira was broken up in 1941.

Teenage trainees at the RAN's Junior Recruit Training Establishment (which operated at Fremantle naval base  from 1960 to 1984) wore shoulder flashes bearing the name "Tingira" as a historical link with the training ship. Tingira Memorial Park, a small park on the Rose Bay waterfront, commemorates HMAS Tingira. The park was established in two phases; the first opening in 1962, the second completed in 1977.

Citations

References
Books

Websites

Notes

Further reading

Training ships of the Royal Australian Navy
Clippers
Victorian-era merchant ships of the United Kingdom
Ships built in Aberdeen
Prison ships
1866 ships
Rose Bay, New South Wales